The Chengdu J-7 (Chinese: 歼-7; third generation export version F-7; NATO reporting name: Fishcan) is a People's Republic of China fighter aircraft. It is a license-built version of the Soviet Mikoyan-Gurevich MiG-21, and thus shares many similarities with the MiG-21. The aircraft is armed  with short-range, infrared homing air-to-air missiles and mainly designed for short range air-to-air combat. The aircraft is also used for close air support.

On 30 March 1962, the Soviet Union and China signed a technology transference arrangement pertaining to the MiG-21. Allegedly, while various kits, components, completed aircraft and associated documents were delivered to the Shenyang Aircraft Factory, the design documentation was incomplete, and Chinese designers made efforts to reverse engineer the aircraft. While the two aircraft are greatly similar, areas of difference include the hydraulic systems and internal fuel arrangements. During March 1964, domestic production of the J-7 reportedly commenced at the Shenyang Aircraft Factory, but due to various factors including the Cultural Revolution, mass production was only truly achieved during the 1980s. Numerous models of the J-7 were developed, featuring improvements in areas such as the armament, avionics, and wing design.

The aircraft is principally operated by the People's Liberation Army Air Force (PLAAF), but numerous international operators have bought their own J-7s. Outside of China, the largest operator of the J-7 is the Pakistan Air Force. Later generation Chinese aircraft, such as the Shenyang J-8 interceptor, were developed with the lessons learned from the J-7 programme. Several nations, including Zimbabwe, Tanzania, and Sri Lanka, deployed the type in offensive roles.

In 2013, production of the J-7 was terminated after the delivery of 16 F-7BGI to the Bangladesh Air Force. Newer fighter aircraft, such as the JF-17 Thunder multirole fighter, have succeeded it in the export market. To date, large numbers of J-7s remain in service with multiple export customers, with PLAAF set to retire the fleet in 2023.

Design and development

Background
In the 1950s and early 1960s, the Soviet Union shared a large proportion of its conventional weapons technology with its neighbor, the People's Republic of China. One such example is the MiG-19, which was locally produced by China as the Shenyang J-6 from as early as 1958. During the same decade, the even more capable MiG-21 had been developed by the Soviets; this fighter, being inexpensive but fast, suited the strategy of forming large groups of 'people's fighters' to overcome the technological advantages of Western aircraft. However, the Sino-Soviet split abruptly ended initial cooperation efforts; between 28 July 28 and 1 September 1960, the Soviet Union withdrew its advisers from China, resulting in the J-7 project coming to a halt in China.

During February 1962, Soviet Premier Nikita Khrushchev unexpectedly wrote to Mao Zedong to inform him that the Soviet Union was willing to transfer MiG-21 technology to China, and he asked the Chinese to promptly send their representatives to the Soviet Union to discuss arrangements. The Chinese viewed this offer as a Soviet gesture to make peace, while suspicious, they were nonetheless eager to take up the Soviet offer of an aircraft deal. A delegation headed by General Liu Yalou, the commander-in-chief of the People's Liberation Army Air Force (PLAAF) and himself a Soviet military academy graduate, was dispatched to Moscow immediately; the Chinese delegation was given three days to visit the MiG-21's production facility, which was previously off-limits to foreigners. The visit's authorization was personally given by Nikita Khrushchev, and on 30 March 1962, the technology transfer deal was signed.

Establishing production
However, given the state of political relations between the two countries, the Chinese were not optimistic about gaining the technology, and allegedly made preparations to reverse engineer the aircraft. Russian sources state that several complete MiG-21s were sent to China, flown by Soviet pilots, while MiG-21Fs in kit form was also sent along with parts and technical documents. As the Chinese had expected, following the delivery of kits, parts and documents to Shenyang Aircraft Factory five months after the deal was signed, it was discovered that some technical documents provided by the Soviets were incomplete and that several parts could not be used.

China set about to engineer the aircraft for local production; in doing so, they successfully solved 249 major issues and reproduced eight major technical documents that were not provided by the Soviet Union. One of the major flaws was with the hydraulic systems, which grounded up to 70% of some squadron's aircraft until upgrades were made. Another major modification was to the fuel storage, increasing the aircraft's stability. The MiG-21 carries most of its fuel in the forward fuselage, causing the center of gravity to shift and become unstable after about 45 minutes of operation. The J-7 has redesigned fuel tanks and significantly larger drop tanks in order to maintain a more stable center of gravity, and therefore better Longitudinal static stability. The cockpit was also revised to replace the Soviet ejection seat, which was deemed to be unacceptable. The forward opening canopy was replaced by a standard rear-hinged canopy, which was jettisoned prior to ejection. The re-engineering effort was largely successful, as the Chinese-built J-7 showed only minor differences in design and performance from the original MiG-21.

During March 1964, domestic production of the J-7 reportedly commenced at the Shenyang Aircraft Factory. However, mass production efforts were severely hindered by an unexpected social and economic problem—the Cultural Revolution—that resulted in poor initial quality and slow progress. Achieving full domestic production had involved not only the local assembly of the aircraft itself, but the production of its various components and systems, including its turbojet powerplant. As a consequence, full-scale production of the J-7 was only truly achieved during the 1980s, by which time the original aircraft design was showing its age. By the 1980s, quantity production of the General Dynamics F-16 Fighting Falcon fighter was well underway in the United States; this relatively-affordable single-engined western fighter was considerably more agile than the J-7, even with the former carrying a greater payload.

Further development
In 1987, the J-7E was released, having a greatly improved wing, among other improvements. It was roughly 45% more maneuverable, and its takeoff and landing performance was greatly increased. It was also equipped with a helmet mounted sight, as well as being the first MiG-21 variant to be equipped with HOTAS and a multipurpose display. Many of the electronic components were British in origin, such as the gun sight and the multi purpose display. The aircraft is capable of using PL-8/Python 3 missiles with both the helmet mounted sight or the radar fire control, but the two are not connected. The pilot may use only one system at a time.

In the mid 1980s, Pakistan requested an aircraft with greater radar capabilities. Both the standard radar and the British Marconi radar were plagued by ground clutter, but China did not have any experience with air to ground radar at the time. In 1984, Pakistan provided assistance by having their American-trained F-16 pilots provide training on proper ground attack radar operation, which enabled the Chinese to develop the J-7M. In the late 1980s, the J-7MP and J-7PG introduced significant upgrades to the radar system by converting to an Italian FIAR Grifo-7 radar, more than tripled the effective range of the radar, as well as greatly increased the maximum angle for target detection.

The J-7 only reached its Soviet-designed capabilities in the mid 1980s. Being relatively affordable, it was widely exported as the F-7, often with Western systems incorporated, such as to Pakistan. There are over 20 different export variants of the J-7, some of which are equipped to use European weaponry, such as French R.550 Magic missiles. The Discovery Channel's Wings Over The Red Star series claims that the Chinese intercepted several Soviet MiG-21s en route to North Vietnam (during the Vietnam War), but these aircraft did not perform in a manner consistent with their original specifications, suggesting that the Chinese actually intercepted down-rated aircraft that were intended for export, rather than fully capable production aircraft. For this reason, the Chinese had to re-engineer the intercepted MiG-21 airframes in order to achieve their original capabilities. China later developed the Shenyang J-8 based both on the expertise gained by the program, and by utilizing the incomplete technical information acquired from the Soviet Ye-152 developmental jet.

During May 2013, production of the J-7 was permanently terminated, bringing to a close a period of manufacturing stretching almost 50 years.

At the China International Aviation & Aerospace Exhibition in 2018, a display showing the J-7 as an unmanned platform was shown.

Operational history

Africa
Namibia
During August 2005, Namibia ordered 12 F-7NMs for its air force; Chinese sources reported the delivery in November 2006. The model procured is believed to be a variation of the F-7PG acquired by Pakistan with Grifo MG radar.

Nigeria

In early 2008, Nigeria procured 12 F-7NI fighters and three FT-7NI trainers to replace its existing inventory of MiG-21 fighters. On 20 September 2018, one pilot was killed after two Nigerian F-7Ni aircraft crashed into Katamkpe Hill, Abuja while rehearsing for an aerial display to mark Nigeria's 58th Independence Anniversary celebrations.

Sudan
During the lengthy Second Sudanese Civil War, Sudan procured a number of F-7s. In November 1993, it was reported that Iran had allegedly financed Sudan's purchase of around 20 Chinese ground-attack aircraft, having pledged $17 million in financial aid to the Sudanese government and arranged for $300 million in Chinese arms to be delivered to the Sudanese Army.

Tanzania
The Tanzanian Air Force deployed its F-7As during the Uganda–Tanzania War against Uganda and Libya, fought between 1978 and 1979. Forming a major component of Tanzania's combat aircraft, the type facilitated the defeat of the nominally stronger Uganda Army Air Force during the air campaign.

Zimbabwe
Due to their very limited operational capabilities in the absence of ground support from radars, Zimbabwean F-7s were never used in combat operations during the Second Congo War. Their only deployment in the DR Congo took place in January 2001, when four aircraft were to participate in the burial ceremony for the assassinated president, Laurent-Désiré Kabila. During the journey from Zimbabwe to Kinshasa, one of them crashed, with its pilot ejecting safely. Moreover, on the return trip, two aircraft were damaged on landing, although both were repaired and returned to service.

Europe

Albania
The deployment of F-7As near the country's northern border successfully checked Yugoslav incursions into Albanian airspace.

East and Southeast Asia
China
Throughout the mid-1990s, the PLAAF began to replace its J-7B inventory with the substantially redesigned and improved J-7E variant. The wings of the J-7E have a new "double delta" design offering improved aerodynamics and increased fuel capacity, and the J-7E also features a more powerful engine and improved avionics. The newest version of the J-7, the J-7G, entered service with the PLAAF in 2003.

The principal role of the J-7 in Chinese service is to provide local air defense and tactical air superiority. Large numbers are to be employed to deter enemy air operations.

In June 2021, four J-7s participated in a combat drill conducted near Taiwan's air defense identification zone.

The decommissioning of the J-7 began in 2018, with the whole fleet set to retire in 2023. According to the US Air Force China Aerospace Studies Institute, the retirement of J-7 marked the PLAAF's transition to a fleet composed of only fourth-generation and fifth-generation aircraft. According to the Chinese media, PLAAF also considered turning J-7 into drones for training tools and aerial decoys.

Myanmar

During the 1990s, Myanmar reportedly established four squadrons of F-7s, which have been primarily used for air defense duties. Technical difficulties have reportedly plagued the fleet early on, and their ground-attack performance was not deemed sufficient. Since then, Myanmar has improved the F-7 fleet's capabilities via a modernisation programme. A series of upgrades were allegedly performed by a combination of Chinese and Israeli enterprises; although confirmed details on the arrangements have remained sparse, changes reportedly include the adoption of various Israeli-built missiles.

Middle East
Iran
During the 1980s, Iran procured a number of F-7s, despite Chinese officials issuing denials of directly supplying military equipment to the country at that time. Despite its use as a frontline fighter, the type has not been involved in any known combat actions. By the 21st century, it was largely relegated to use as a trainer aircraft. The F-7 has also been used as a flying test bed for various indigenous technologies. In the recent years, maintaining the fleet's operational status has reportedly become difficult. This is caused by the limited availability of spare parts, despite efforts by domestic industries to fill in, but also by the age of the airframes, which have accumulated excessive numbers of flight hours.

Iranian F-7s have featured in several movies, often portraying Iranian MiG-21s during the Iran–Iraq War. One tells the story of an Islamic Republic of Iran Air Force strike on the Iraqi nuclear reactor at Osirak on 30 September 1980. Another one, "Attack on H3", tells the story of the 810 km-deep raid against Iraqi Air Force airfields on 4 April 1981, and other movies depicting the air combat in 1981 that resulted in the downing of around 70 Iraqi aircraft.

Iraq
Iraqi F-7Bs were never used in combat, but only as advanced trainers.

South Asia
 
Bangladesh

The Bangladeshi Air Force currently operates FT-7MB Airguards, and F-7BG and F-7BGI interceptors. The 16 F-7BGIs of the Bangladesh Air Force entered service in 2013. The F-7BGI is one of the most advanced variants, and the last production model of the F-7/J-7 family.

Pakistan
Pakistan has been the largest non-Chinese operator of the F-7, having procured around 120 F-7P and 60 F-7PG to equip the Pakistan Air Force. During the 1980s, seeking to increase the effectiveness of its F-7 fleet, Pakistan engaged in Project Sabre II, a design study involving both China and the US aircraft manufacturer Grumman, aimed at redesigning and upgrading the F-7; however, by 1989, this effort was abandoned largely as a consequence of economic sanctions having been imposed by the US. That same year, China and Grumman started a new design study to develop the Super 7, another redesign of the F-7. Grumman left the project when sanctions were placed on China following the political fallout from the 1989 Tiananmen Square protests. During 1991, another initiative was launched; originally known as the Fighter China project, this would eventually result in the JF-17 Thunder multirole fighter.

Pakistan has long planned to replace its entire F-7 fleet, along with various other fighters in its inventory, with JF-17s, which was principally developed in order to satisfy a requirement issued by the Pakistan Air Force for an affordable and modern combat aircraft.

Sri Lanka

In 1991, the Sri Lanka Air Force (SLAF) was looking for a jet attack aircraft to provide fast close air support to its army. With western countries refusing to sell attack aircraft, the Government of Sri Lanka approached China for the purchase of several Nanchang Q-5s, which had the range and payload capacity needed by the SLAF, and was already used by Pakistan and Bangladesh. Due to pressure from the west, China agreed to sell a small number of F-7BS fighters which allowed the SLAF to restore is fast jet capabilities that were lost a decade back. Due to the type's comparative lack of endurance and payload, the SLAF has periodically used its F-7s for pilot training purposes. Early in 2008, the air force received six more advanced F-7Gs, to use primarily as interceptors. All of the F-7Gs, F-7BS' and FT-7s are flown by the No 5 Jet Squadron.

The SLAF has repeatedly deployed its F-7BS to conduct ground-attack missions against the Liberation Tigers of Tamil Eelam (LTTE). Sri Lankan officials reported that on 9 September 2008, three F-7s were scrambled after two rebel-flown Zlín-143s were detected by a ground radar. Two F-7s were sent to bomb two rebel airstrips in the Mullaitivu and Kilinochchi areas, while the third reportedly intercepted one Zlín-143. According to the Sri Lankan government, the rebel-flown aircraft was shot down by the chasing F-7G using an air-to-air missile, as it was returning to Mullaitivu after a bombing run against Vavuniya Airport.

Variants

Operators

Current

 Bangladesh Air Force: 12 × F-7BG fighter and 4 × FT-7BG two-seater operational conversion trainer delivered in 2007. Additional 16 advanced F-7BGI fighters delivered in 2012. Most of the earlier deliveries of 16 F-7MB and 8 FT-7MB trainer aircraft now retired from service.

 People's Liberation Army Air Force: 290 × J-7 plus 40× J-7 trainers remained in service.
 People's Liberation Army Naval Air Force: 30× J-7D/E remained in service.

 Egyptian Air Force: 74 × F-7 in service.

 Islamic Republic of Iran Air Force: 20 × F-7 in service.

 Myanmar Air Force: 62 aircraft were received between 1990 and 1999. 24 × F-7M and 6 × FT-7 trainers remained in service.

 Namibian Air Force: 6 × F-7NM and 2 × FT-7NM in active service. A total of 12 F/FT-7NM aircraft were delivered between 2006 and 2008.

 Nigerian Air Force: 12 × F-7 and 2 × FT-7.

 North Korean Air Force: , 180 × F-7 remained in service. However, reports of dire levels of serviceability suggest an airworthiness rate of less than 50%.

 Sri Lankan Air Force: , 5 × F-7GS/BS and 1 × FT-7 trainer remained in service.

 Tanzanian Air Force: Originally having had 11 × F-7 in service, Tanzania replaced them with 12 new J-7's (single-seat) under the designation J-7G and 2 dual-seat aircraft designated F-7TN in 2011. Originally ordered in 2009, the deliveries were completed and the aircraft are now fully operational at the air bases in Dar es Salaam and Mwanza. The new aircraft are equipped with a KLJ-6E Falcon radar, thought to be developed from the Selex Galileo Grifo 7 radar. The J-7G's primary weapon is the Chinese PL-7A short-range infrared air-to-air missile.

 Air Force of Zimbabwe: 12 x F-7II/IIN and 2 x FT-7BZ delivered. , 7 × F-7 remained in service.

Former

 Albanian Air Force: Total 12 F-7A in service from 1969 through 2004, now retired.

 Iraqi Air Force: 80 × F-7, all retired.

 Pakistan Air Force: , 48 × F7-PG (out of the original 60) plus 6 × FT-7 remained in service. Last few F7P retired from CCS Dashings squadron in 2021. 
 No. 19 Squadron Sherdils – Operated F-7P/FT-7P from 1990 until April 2014. Replaced by F-16A/B Block 15 ADF.
 CCS Dashings – Operated F-7P from 1992 until 2021. Replaced by JF-17 Block 1.

 United States Air Force (Foreign Technology Evaluation: MiG-21F-13)

Specifications (J-7MG)

Accidents and incidents
 On April 8, 2008, Squadron Leader Morshed Hasan died when F-7 of Bangladesh Air Force (BAF)  crashed in Ghatail upazila of Tangail.The pilot ejected from the aircraft but was critically injured when its parachute malfunctioned. He died at Combined Military Hospital (CMH) in Dhaka after he had been rescued from the scene. 
 On May 6, 2010, a Chinese PLAAF J-7 crashed due to engine failure near Jinan, China.
 On April 13, 2011, a Chinese PLAAF J-7 crashed near Liu Jiang County and Xin Cheng County, Liu Zhou City during a training flight.
 On December 4, 2012, a Chinese PLAAF J-7 crashed into a residential building in Shantou, Guangdong province. 4 civilians were injured as a result of the crash.
 On June 29, 2015, Flight Lieutenant Tahmid went missing when F-7MB of Bangladesh Air Force (BAF) crashed into Bay of Bengal. The Aircraft took off around 10:27am from the Johurul Haque air base, lost contact with the control room around 11:10am which later crashed in the Bay of Bengal in Patenga around 11:30am.
 On 24 November 2015, flying officer Marium Mukhtiar – the first female fighter pilot in the Pakistan Air Force (PAF), died when a twin-seat FT-7PG crashed at PAF Base M.M. Alam near Kundian in Punjab province on a training mission. Both pilots ejected, but she succumbed to injuries received on landing. She was occupying the rear seat for Instrument Flight Rules training.
 On November 23, 2018, Wing Commander Arif Ahmed Dipu died when F-7BG of Bangladesh Air Force (BAF)  crashed in Tangail's Madhupur upazila on a training mission. The fuel tanker of the aircraft reportedly caught fire once it used weaponry in the sky, leading the pilot to eject in low altitude.
On 7 January 2020, Pakistan Air Force (PAF) F-7 crashed while on a routine operational training mission near Mianwali. Both pilots lost their lives in the crash.
On 24 May 2022, 2 Iranian pilots were killed when their F7 crashed near Anarak, 200 km (124 miles) east of the city of Isfahan.
On 9 June 2022, a PLAAF J-7 crashed in a residential area in Hubei, China, destroying several houses and killing at least one person on the ground. The pilot ejected with minor injuries.

See also

References

Citations

Bibliography

 
 
 Gordon, Yefim and Dmitry Komissarov. Chinese Aircraft: China's Aviation Industry since 1951. Manchester, UK: Hikoki Publications, 2008. .
 
 Jackson, Paul. Jane's All The World's Aircraft 2003–2004. Coulsdon, UK: Jane's Information Group, 2003. .
 Medeiros, Evan S., Roger Cliff, Keith Crane and James C. Mulvenon. A New Direction for China's Defense Industry. Rand Corporation, 2005. .
 
 "World Air Forces". Flight International, 14–20 December 2010. pp. 26–53.

External links 

 F-7 Fighter Family
 FT-7/JJ-7 Trainer
 Technical Data from MiG-21.de
 Globalsecurity.org
 Sino Defense Today

J-7
JJ-7
1960s Chinese fighter aircraft
JJ-07
Single-engined jet aircraft
China–Soviet Union relations
Mikoyan-Gurevich MiG-21
Aircraft first flown in 1966
Mid-wing aircraft
Second-generation jet fighters